Kotdwar Legislative Assembly constituency Vidhan Sabha constituency  is one of the 70 assembly constituencies of  Uttarakhand, a northern state of India. Kotdwar is a part of Garhwal Lok Sabha constituency.

Members of Legislative Assembly
 2002 - Surendra Singh Negi (INC)
 2005 - Surendra Singh Negi (INC)
 2007 - Shailendra Singh Rawat (BJP)
 2012 - Surendra Singh Negi (INC)
 2017 - Harak Singh Rawat (BJP)
 2022  -  Ritu Khanduri Bhushan (BJP)

Election results

2022

See also
 Tehri Garhwal (Lok Sabha constituency)

References

External links
  
 
 http://ceo.uk.gov.in/files/Election2012/RESULTS_2012_Uttarakhand_State.pdf
 

Pauri Garhwal district
Assembly constituencies of Uttarakhand
2002 establishments in Uttarakhand
Constituencies established in 2002